Hancock Whitney Corp. is a bank holding company headquartered in Gulfport, Mississippi. It operates 237 branches in Mississippi, Alabama, Florida, Louisiana, and Texas. The bank is the official bank of the New Orleans Saints and issues the official debit card.  The bank is also the official bank of LSU Athletics and issues the official debit card and credit card.

History

Early history 

Hancock County Bank was founded in 1899 in Bay Saint Louis, Mississippi by 19 individuals. On its first day, the bank opened with $10,000 in capital and $8,277.41 in  deposits. The bank was originally founded to capitalize on the booming lumber, cotton, and wool trades and also the market for poultry and produce.

On January 8, 1902, the bank opened a branch in Pearlington, Mississippi, followed by a branch in Pass Christian, Mississippi, the popular destination of Northerners fleeing the brutal winters, and of affluent New Orleanians seeking relief from the sweltering heat of the summers.

The Pearlington and Logtown branches were closed after the decline of the lumber industry and the company turned its attention toward Gulfport, Mississippi and Biloxi, Mississippi.

During the Wall Street Crash of 1929, 162 Mississippi banks failed, leaving Gulfport without a bank. Some Gulfport residents were already customers at the Long Beach, Mississippi branch and several Gulfport businessmen appealed to the bank to open a downtown Gulfport branch. The bank opened a branch at the corner of 13th Street and 26th Avenue in the former First National Bank of Gulfport Building. In 1933, the bank moved to the location that would become One Hancock Plaza in downtown Gulfport, and the company changed its domicile to Gulfport and renamed the company Hancock Bank.

Recent history 
Hancock Bank acquired Baton Rouge, Louisiana-based American Bank of Baton Rouge in 1990; Washington Bank and Trust Co. of Franklinton, Louisiana for $15 million in 1994;and American Security Bank based in Ville Platte, Louisiana in 1999, raising assets to $3 billion.  It acquired Lamar Bank, opening up the south-central Mississippi marketplace and establishing a presence in Hattiesburg, Mississippi, in 2001; and Tallahassee, Florida-based Guaranty National Bank and its 5 branches in 2004.

Additionally, bank's insurance services were expanded by acquiring the 103-year-old Ross King Walker, Inc., based in Hattiesburg in 2004; and J. Everett Eaves, Inc., based in New Orleans in 2005.

In 2006, Hancock Bank of Alabama was issued a charter to operate in Alabama.

In 2009, the bank acquired Peoples First Bank of Panama City, Florida after the latter was seized by the Office of Thrift Supervision after suffering from bank failure.  In 2011, the bank acquired Whitney Holding Corporation.  In 2017, the bank acquired First NBC Bank, which was seized by regulators after suffering from bank failure.

In May 2018, the company changed its name to Hancock Whitney Corp.

In 2018, Hancock Whitney acquired the Trust and Asset Management business from Capital One.  In 2019, Hancock Whitney purchased MidSouth Bank.

See also
Hancock Whitney Stadium

References

External links

Banks based in Mississippi
American companies established in 1899
Banks established in 1899
Companies listed on the Nasdaq
Gulfport, Mississippi
1899 establishments in Mississippi